Bakar or Bekar may refer to:
 Bakar-e Olya
 Bakar-e Sofla